WJSE (106.3 FM) is a radio station broadcasting an alternative rock format. Licensed to the North Cape May section of Lower Township, Cape May County, New Jersey, United States, the station serves the Cape May–Atlantic City radio market. WJSE also serves coastal Delaware and the Ocean City, Maryland area as a secondary market.

History
The station went on the air as WIFB at 106.7 MHz on July 30, 1992. On April 1, 1993 the station changed to a local news/talk format as WJNN; on June 8, 2001 to alternative rock as WDOX; and on April 14, 2005 to Top 40/CHR under the WSJQ call letters.

 On September 18, 2008 WSJQ began stunting, playing humorous clips from television shows such as South Park informing listeners that WSJQ was no more. Several days later, the station changed its call sign to WKOE, branding to "Coast Country 106.7", and format to country music. The station also began broadcast of the John Boy and Billy show. The station changed to an oldies format, adopting the WFNE call sign on April 1, 2010.

On December 29, 2011 the station moved to 106.3, and increased its transmitting power from 3,000 watts to 6,000 watts along with moving to a new tower five miles east-north east to Wildwood, New Jersey and seguing to a classic hits format as "Fun 106.3". This new power and location combination would allow the 106.3 signal to be heard from Millville in Cumberland County in the west to Beach Haven in Ocean County to the north and Ocean City, Maryland to the south.

On Friday, August 31, 2012 at midnight, WFNE returned to alternative rock, under the "WJSE Rocks" branding.

After a five-year stint with alternative rock, WJSE reverted to classic hits as "106.3 The Shore" on Monday, April 17, 2017.

In 2019, 106.3 The Shore shifted from a classic hits based playlist to an oldies playlist adding in more music from the entire 1960s decade and adding in music from the 1950s decade and removing all music from the 1980s and changing their slogan from South Jersey's Greatest Hits to South Jersey's Greatest Hits of the 50s, 60s and 70s.

Sometime between October 30 and November 2, 2020 at midnight, 106.3 WJSE dropped its three year old branding and evolved format from classic hits that evolved into an oldies format and reverted to its previous format and branding as, 106.3 WJSE, The Rock Alternative with a heavy rock leaning alternative rock format according to one of the stations staff.

References

External links
Official website

JSE
Lower Township, New Jersey
Modern rock radio stations in the United States